Zayed Sports City Stadium is a multi-purpose stadium located in Zayed Sports City, Abu Dhabi, United Arab Emirates.

The largest stadium in the UAE with 45,000 seats, it has iconic status and was featured on the AED 200 banknote.

The stadium was opened in 1979 and was renovated in 2009, with many of the facilities and amenities upgraded to ensure that it complies with international standards and can be used for a wide range of events.

The stadium hosted the 1996 AFC Asian Cup including the final, where the United Arab Emirates lost against Saudi Arabia in penalty shoot-outs. The stadium also hosted the 2003 FIFA World Youth Championship and the 18th Arabian Gulf Cup. The semifinals and finals of 2009 and 2010 FIFA Club World Cups were also held at the stadium. The stadium again hosted the Club World Cup in 2017 and 2018. It also held the 2019 AFC Asian Cup. It staged the opening and final matches.

History

Development 

Initiated by then-UAE President Sheikh Zayed bin Sultan Al Nahyan's desire, directions were issued to the Town Planning Department in 1974 to build a comprehensive sports complex of high international standards in Abu Dhabi.

Zayed Sports City Stadium was the crux of the first project phase, and a 60,000 seat stadium was constructed. This phase also included perimeter fencing, utility services and an internal road network. It was completed in 1979 and the stadium was inaugurated in January 1980. The total cost of this phase was AED 550 million. The stadium included full size grass pitch surrounded facilities to host athletics competitions. An electronic board and a sound system were installed as well as a modern electronic irrigation system. The building was designed to host international sporting events and provided media personnel with sufficient facilities to cover and broadcast tournaments via satellites.

The external design of the stadium features iconic arches which are showcased in the venue’s logo as well as on the AED 200 banknote.

Renovations 

Throughout the years, the stadium has undergone significant renovations to ensure that it can accommodate the high-quality international events it was designed for. Hospitality areas, including the Royal Box interior and exterior, VIP seating and media seating were created throughout the years. Two scoreboards at either end zone were added in 2003. Renovations such as these have reduced the capacity to 43,791 public seats. 

In preparation for the 2009 FIFA Club World Cup, architecture firm Populous led renovation works at the stadium, including brand new team locker rooms, wayfinding updates, refurbishments to the public facilities, updates to the Royal Box and installation of a new pitch lighting system. London-based company ISG was the construction contractor for the project.

Current features 
The stadium is a traditional, open-air stadium that is defined on its exterior by iconic arches. Within the stadium is a full-size football pitch and a wide concrete apron surrounds it. There are 42,355 general entry seats on two levels plus 1,436 hospitality seats and 277 media seats. There is also a royal box with indoor and outdoor viewing areas and six media / hospitality sky boxes. On the concourses are concession kiosks, toilets and first aid facilities.

Back of house areas include space for media, hospitality, players, referees and storage. There are also several offices located in the stadium.

Three LED scoreboards are present in the venue as well as a sound system for spectators. The venue is fully lit to the standard required for HDTV broadcasts.

Surrounding the stadium is a pre-event plaza, then a series of fountains. Beyond this is the ring road, parking lots, training pitches and the rest of the Zayed Sports City facilities.

2019 AFC Asian Cup 
Zayed Sports City Stadium hosted eight games of the 2019 AFC Asian Cup, including the opening match, and a Round of 16 and quarter-final match, as well as the final.

Events

Zayed Sports City Stadium has hosted hundreds of events, large and small, in its history. Some of these have left a mark on the history of not only the stadium, but also on Abu Dhabi, the UAE and the GCC.
 1980– Friendship Football Tournament
 1981 – Asian Youth Cup
 1982 – 6th Arabian Gulf Cup
 1983 – Saudi v Kuwait military football match
 1984 – Olympic Football Qualification Matches
 1984 – International Athletics Meet (included Italy National Team)
 1985 – AFC Youth Championship
 1986 – 2nd Asian Juniors Football Championship
 1988 – Asian Cup Qualification matches
 1989 – American Rodeo Festival (on the occasion of UAE 18th National Day)
 1991 – Abu Dhabi Police Directorate Soccer Tournament
 1994 – 12th Arabian Gulf Cup
 1996 – AFC Asian Cup
 1998 – Arab Knight Festival Closing Ceremonies
 1999 – 14th FIQ World Bowling Championships Opening Ceremony
 2003 – FIFA World Youth Championship
 2007 – 18th Arabian Gulf Cup
 2008 – George Michael and Alicia Keys Concert
 2009 – FIFA Club World Cup
 2010 – FIFA Club World Cup
 2011 – UAE 40th National Day Official Ceremony
 2013 – Monster Jam
 2014 – Nitro Circus Live
 2017 – FIFA Club World Cup
 2018 – FIFA Club World Cup
 2019 – AFC Asian Cup
 2019 – Special Olympics World Summer Games
 2019 – UAE National Day Celebrations

See also

Abu Dhabi
Football in the United Arab Emirates
Sport in the United Arab Emirates

References

External links

 Official website of Zayed Sports City
 

Athletics (track and field) venues in the United Arab Emirates
Sports venues in Abu Dhabi
Football venues in Abu Dhabi
AFC Asian Cup stadiums
National stadiums
Multi-purpose stadiums in the United Arab Emirates
Sports venues completed in 1980
1980 establishments in the United Arab Emirates